Turbonilla krebsii is a species of sea snail, a marine gastropod mollusk in the family Pyramidellidae, the pyrams and their allies.

Description
The length of the shell varies between 4 mm and 6 mm.

Distribution
This marine species occurs in the following locations:
 Caribbean Sea : Cuba
 Gulf of Mexico
 Lesser Antilles: Virgin Islands
 Atlantic Ocean: Bahamas, Brazil

References

 Aguayo, C. G. and M. L. Jaume. 1936. Sobre algunos moluscos marinos de Cuba. Memorias de la Sociedad Cubana de Historia Natural 10: 115-122

External links
 To Encyclopedia of Life
 To World Register of Marine Species

krebsii
Gastropods described in 1875